Henry Feldwick (1844 – 3 August 1908) was a 19th-century member of parliament from the Southland region of New Zealand.

He was defeated in 1879 by James Bain, in 1884 by Joseph Hatch, and in 1890 by James Kelly.

He was a member of the New Zealand Legislative Council from 1892 to 3 August 1908, when he died.

Notes

References 

1844 births
1908 deaths
Members of the New Zealand House of Representatives
Members of the New Zealand Legislative Council
New Zealand MPs for South Island electorates
Unsuccessful candidates in the 1879 New Zealand general election
Unsuccessful candidates in the 1884 New Zealand general election
Unsuccessful candidates in the 1890 New Zealand general election
19th-century New Zealand politicians